David Michael Albert Betts (born November 30, 1957) is a Canadian rock drummer, best known as the drummer for Canadian rock band Honeymoon Suite.

The son of Albert Arthur Betts (1927-2011) and Muriel Jean Betts (née Thomson) (1925–1985), Dave was raised in Toronto and attended Roywood Drive Public School, Donview Heights Junior High and George S. Henry Secondary School. After high school, attended Fanshawe College in London, Ontario Canada, where he studied Music Industry Arts.

After failing to complete the program, he worked at Long & McQuade in Toronto selling drums for one year.

Betts began his music career playing and recording for Steve Blimkie and The Reason (1979–1982), who had two releases on Ready Records. In 1983, he joined Honeymoon Suite, replacing their original drummer, Mike Lengyell. He recorded and toured extensively with the band for eight years, before leaving in 1991.

From 1992 to 2003, He worked for SOCAN in member service/relations in Toronto.

In 2007, Betts reunited with the other "classic line-up" members of Honeymoon Suite (although original keyboardist Ray Coburn has since left the band), where he has continued to this day. 
He also teaches Music Publishing And Copyright at Harris Institute in Toronto, Ontario, Canada.

He is married to Jennifer Mossop and has one daughter, Aylish Betts.

References

External links
Brief Biography from the Honeymoon Suite website

Canadian rock drummers
Canadian male drummers
Musicians from Toronto
1957 births
Living people
Fanshawe College alumni